Pavel Arkadevich Pevzner is the Ronald R. Taylor Professor of Computer Science and Director of the NIH Center for Computational Mass Spectrometry at University of California, San Diego.  He serves on the Editorial Board of PLoS Computational Biology and he is a member of the Genome Institute of Singapore scientific advisory board.

Education
Pevzner received his Ph.D. in Mathematics and Physics from the Moscow Institute of Physics and Technology while working for Russian Research Institute for Genetics and Selection of Industrial Microorganisms (NII Genetika). In 1990, he joined Michael Waterman's laboratory at the Department of Mathematics at the University of Southern California for two years as a postdoctoral research associate.

Career and research
Pevzner is interested in new approaches to teaching computational molecular biology at both undergraduate and graduate level, serving as a founding instructor for the Bioinformatics Specialization on Coursera and having written several books on Bioinformatics and Computational Biology.

In 1992, Pevzner took a position of an associate professor at the Pennsylvania State University.

In 1995, Pevzner moved back to the University of Southern California as a Professor of Mathematics, Computer Science, and Molecular Biology. Since 2000, he has been the Ronald R. Taylor Professor of Computer Science at the University of California, San Diego and he is the Director of the NIH Center for Computational Mass Spectrometry.

Books
 Computational Molecular Biology, MIT Press, 2000 
 An Introduction to Bioinformatics Algorithms, MIT Press, 2004 (co-authored with Neil Jones) 
 Bioinformatics for Biologists, Cambridge University Press, 2011 (co-edited with Ron Shamir)
 Bioinformatics Algorithms: An Active Learning Approach, Active Learning Publishers, 2014 (co-authored with Phillip Compeau)

Awards and honors
 NSF Young Investigator Award (1994, 1995)
 HHMI Professor award (2006) from the Howard Hughes Medical Institute
 UCSD Chancellor Associates Award for Excellence in Research (2007)
 ACM Fellow (2010), for contribution to algorithms for genome rearrangements, DNA sequencing, and proteomics
 Honoris causa degree (2011) from Simon Fraser University
 ISCB Fellow (2012)
 ISCB Senior Scientist Award (2017)
 ACM Paris Kanellakis Theory and Practice Award (2018)

References

Russian bioinformaticians
Fellows of the International Society for Computational Biology
Fellows of the Association for Computing Machinery
Living people
Moscow Institute of Physics and Technology alumni
University of California, San Diego faculty
Year of birth missing (living people)
20th-century Russian mathematicians
21st-century Russian mathematicians
20th-century Russian physicists
21st-century Russian physicists